European route E49 forms part of the International E-road network. It begins in Magdeburg, Germany, and ends in Vienna, Austria. 

The road follows the route:
 Germany
 : - Magdeburg, Halle, Saxony-Anhalt,
 :
 : - Plauen
 Czech Republic
 
 : Cheb, Karlovy Vary
 : Plzeň, Písek, České Budějovice
 : Třeboň
 
 Austria
: Horn
: Stockerau
: Vienna

References

External links 
 UN Economic Commission for Europe: Overall Map of E-road Network (2007)

49
E049
E049
E049
E049